Standings and results for Group 4 of the UEFA Euro 1980 qualifying tournament.

Group 4 consisted of Netherlands, Poland, East Germany, Switzerland, and Iceland. Group winners were Netherlands, who outran Poland by a single point.

Final table

Results

Goalscorers

References

Group 4
1978–79 in East German football
1979–80 in East German football
1978–79 in Polish football
1979–80 in Polish football
1978–79 in Dutch football
Qual
1978–79 in Swiss football
1979–80 in Swiss football
1978 in Icelandic football
1979 in Icelandic football